Tristachycera viridis is a species of central American beetle in the subfamily Cerambycinae, the only species in the genus Tristachycera.

References

Xystrocerini
Monotypic beetle genera